Enceladus is a genus of ground beetles in the family Carabidae. This genus has a single species, Enceladus gygas, found in South America.

References

Siagoninae